The West Philadelphia Streetcar Suburb Historic District is an area of West Philadelphia listed on the National Register of Historic Places.  It represented the transformation of Philadelphia's rural farmland into urban residential development, made possible by the streetcar, which provided easy access to Center City. This is an early example of the streetcar suburb.

Development had proceeded during the 19th century to about 43rd Street. The arrival of electrified streetcars in 1892 accelerated development to the west and southwest.

Noted Philadelphia church architect Isaac Pursell (1853-1910) designed the contributing Christ Memorial Church (1887) at 4233-4257 Chestnut Street.

See also

Clark Park
The Woodlands Cemetery
Hamilton Village
Woodland Terrace

References

External links
National Register
Philadelphia Trolley Tracks: history and photos
District Map

Houses on the National Register of Historic Places in Pennsylvania
Queen Anne architecture in Pennsylvania
Colonial Revival architecture in Pennsylvania
Neoclassical architecture in Pennsylvania
Neighborhoods in Philadelphia
National Register of Historic Places in Philadelphia
Historic districts in Philadelphia
West Philadelphia
Houses in Philadelphia
Historic districts on the National Register of Historic Places in Pennsylvania